Ernst Rudolf (born 14 March 1926) was a Swiss racing cyclist. He rode in the 1955 Tour de France.

References

1926 births
Possibly living people
Swiss male cyclists